In Liebe und Freundschaft is an EP by German hard rock singer Doro Pesch, released in 2005 by AFM Records. It is an enhanced CD containing both musical tracks and a live video. The title is German for "For Love and Friendship". The EP was released to launch the upcoming album Warrior Soul and reached position No. 92 in the German singles chart.

Track listing

Bonus
"All We Are" (live video from Bang Your Head Festival 2005)

Personnel

Band members
Doro Pesch – vocals, producer
Nick Douglas – bass, keyboards, backing vocals
Joe Taylor – guitars, backing vocals
Johnny Dee – drums, backing vocals
Oliver Palotai – keyboards, guitars, backing vocals

Additional musicians
Chris Caffery – guitars
Klaus Vanscheidt – guitars
Dirk Wichterich – guitars
Chris Lietz – guitars, keyboards, producer, engineer, mixing
Torsten Sickert – keyboards, producer

References

Doro (musician) EPs
2005 EPs
AFM Records EPs